Farida Guitars is a Chinese musical instruments brand. Farida, launched in 2004, seems to be a copy of Marina guitars and is part of the Grand Reward Education & Entertainment (GREE) portfolio of brands. GREE was founded in 1995, and is based in Guangdong Province. It produces OEM instruments for a selection of other brands in its 120,000 sq. ft. factory. On average, it produces around 13,000 guitars per month.

Farida endorses a number of popular contemporary musicians. These include Frank Turner, The Vaccines, Bombay Bicycle Club, and Sandi Thom.

Farida Guitars are distributed around the world under license. In the US, distribution is handled by famed vintage stringed instrument retailer Elderly Instruments, Inc. In the UK, distribution is handled by Dawsons Music. Instruments manufactured include electric, acoustic and classical guitars and basses.

References

External links 
 Official website

Guitar manufacturing companies
Companies based in Guangdong
Companies established in 2004
Chinese brands
Musical instrument manufacturing companies of China